The 1960 Colorado State College Bears baseball team represented Colorado State College in the 1960 NCAA University Division baseball season. The Bears played their home games at Jackson Field. The team was coached by Pete Butler in his 18th year at Colorado State.

The Bears won the District VII playoff to advanced to the College World Series, where they were defeated by the St. John's Redmen.

Roster

Schedule

! style="" | Regular Season
|- valign="top" 

|- bgcolor="#ffcccc"
| 1 || March 18 || at Arizona || UA Field • Tucson, Arizona || 3–8 || 0–1 || –
|- bgcolor="#ffcccc"
| 2 || March 19 || at Arizona || UA Field • Tucson, Arizona || 5–8 || 0–2 || –
|- bgcolor="#ffcccc"
| 3 || March 19 || at Arizona || UA Field • Tucson, Arizona || 0–1 || 0–3 || –
|- bgcolor="#ffcccc"
| 4 || March 21 || at  || Unknown • Tempe, Arizona || 4–8 || 0–4 || –
|- bgcolor="#ffcccc"
| 5 || March 22 || at Arizona State || Unknown • Tempe, Arizona || 3–7 || 0–5 || –
|- bgcolor="#ccffcc"
| 6 || March  || at  || Lobo Field • Albuquerque, New Mexico || 8–6 || 1–5 || –
|-

|- bgcolor="#ffcccc"
| 7 || April  || vs  || Unknown • Unknown || 1–2 || 1–6 || –
|- bgcolor="#ccffcc"
| 8 || April  || vs  || Unknown • Unknown || 15–1 || 2–6 || 1–0
|- bgcolor="#ccffcc"
| 9 || April  || vs Colorado Mines || Unknown • Unknown || 24–3 || 3–6 || 2–0
|- bgcolor="#ccffcc"
| 10 || April  ||  vs Colorado State || Unknown • Unknown || 5–4 || 4–6 || 2–0
|- bgcolor="#ffcccc"
| 11 || April  ||  vs Colorado State || Unknown • Unknown || 4–7 || 4–7 || 2–0
|- bgcolor="#ccffcc"
| 12 || April  || vs  || Unknown • Unknown || 3–0 || 5–7 || 2–0
|- bgcolor="#ccffcc"
| 13 || April  || vs  || Unknown • Unknown || 15–9 || 6–7 || 2–0
|- bgcolor="#ccffcc"
| 14 || April  || vs Denver || Unknown • Unknown || 7–4 || 7–7 || 2–0
|- bgcolor="#ffcccc"
| 15 || April  || vs  || Unknown • Unknown || 7–10 || 7–8 || 2–1
|- bgcolor="#ccffcc"
| 16 || April  || vs Colorado College || Unknown • Unknown || 25–3 || 8–8 || 3–1
|- bgcolor="#ccffcc"
| 17 || April  || vs Wyoming || Unknown • Unknown || 11–1 || 9–8 || 3–1
|-

|- bgcolor="#ccffcc"
| 18 || May  || vs Colorado Mines || Unknown • Unknown || 4–1 || 10–8 || 4–1
|- bgcolor="#ccffcc"
| 19 || May  || vs  || Unknown • Unknown || 12–2 || 11–8 || 5–1
|- bgcolor="#ccffcc"
| 20 || May  || vs Western State || Unknown • Unknown || 11–3 || 12–8 || 6–1
|- bgcolor="#ccffcc"
| 21 || May  || vs Colorado Mines || Unknown • Unknown || 8–0 || 13–8 || 7–1
|- bgcolor="#ccffcc"
| 22 || May  || vs  || Unknown • Unknown || 16–2 || 14–8 || 8–1
|- bgcolor="#ccffcc"
| 23 || May  || vs Adams State || Unknown • Unknown || 13–3 || 15–8 || 9–1
|- bgcolor="#ccffcc"
| 24 || May  || vs Denver || Unknown • Unknown || 7–3 || 16–8 || 9–1
|- bgcolor="#ccffcc"
| 25 || May  || vs Western State || Unknown • Unknown || 17–4 || 17–8 || 10–1
|- bgcolor="#ccffcc"
| 26 || May  || vs Western State || Unknown • Unknown || 23–9 || 18–8 || 11–1
|- bgcolor="#ccffcc"
| 27 || May  || vs Colorado College || Unknown • Unknown || 5–0 || 19–8 || 12–1
|- bgcolor="#ccffcc"
| 28 || May  || vs Colorado College || Unknown • Unknown || 7–3 || 20–8 || 13–1
|- bgcolor="#ccffcc"
| 29 || May  || vs Adams State|| Unknown • Unknown || 13–5 || 21–8 || 14–1
|- bgcolor="#ccffcc"
| 30 || May  || vs Adams State || Unknown • Unknown || 15–6 || 22–8 || 15–1
|- bgcolor="#ccffcc"
| 31 || May 26 ||  || Jackson Field • Greeley, Colorado || 13–4 || 23–8 || 15–1
|- bgcolor="#ffcccc"
| 32 || May 28 || at Air Force || Falcon Baseball Field • Colorado Springs, Colorado || 12–13 || 23–9 || 15–1
|-

|-
|-
! style="" | Postseason
|- valign="top" 

|- bgcolor="#ffcccc"
| 33 || June  || at  || Derks Field • Salt Lake City, Utah || 3–24 || 23–10 || 15–1
|- bgcolor="#ccffcc"
| 34 || June  || at Utah || Derks Field • Salt Lake City, Utah || 3–2 || 24–10 || 15–1
|- bgcolor="#ccffcc"
| 35 || June  || at Utah || Derks Field • Salt Lake City, Utah || 6–2 || 25–10 || 15–1
|-

|- bgcolor="#ffcccc"
| 36 || June 14 || vs Boston College || Omaha Municipal Stadium • Omaha, Nebraska || 3–8 || 25–11 || 15–1
|- bgcolor="#ffcccc"
| 37 || June 15 || vs St. John's || Omaha Municipal Stadium • Omaha, Nebraska || 2–3 || 25–12 || 15–1
|-

Awards and honors 
Ernie Andrade
All-Rocky Mountain Conference Team

Frank Carbajal
All-Rocky Mountain Conference Team

Paul Chamberlain
All-Rocky Mountain Conference Team

John Groninger
All-Rocky Mountain Conference Team

Wayne Merrit
All-Rocky Mountain Conference Team

References

Northern Colorado Bears baseball seasons
Colorado State College Bears baseball
College World Series seasons
Colorado State College
Rocky Mountain Athletic Conference baseball champion seasons